Oakland (previously known as Hillsdale) is an unincorporated community in Liberty Township, Jackson County, Ohio, United States.

The Hillsdale Post Office was established on August 21, 1882, and discontinued on February 13, 1904. Mail service is now handled through the Jackson branch.

References 

Unincorporated communities in Jackson County, Ohio